The meridian 96° west of Greenwich is a line of longitude that extends from the North Pole across the Arctic Ocean, North America, the Gulf of Mexico, the Pacific Ocean, the Southern Ocean, and Antarctica to the South Pole.

The 96th meridian west forms a great circle with the 84th meridian east.

From Pole to Pole
Starting at the North Pole and heading south to the South Pole, the 96th meridian west passes through:

{| class="wikitable plainrowheaders"
! scope="col" width="120" | Co-ordinates
! scope="col" | Country, territory or sea
! scope="col" | Notes
|-
| style="background:#b0e0e6;" | 
! scope="row" style="background:#b0e0e6;" | Arctic Ocean
| style="background:#b0e0e6;" |
|-
| 
! scope="row" | 
| Nunavut — Axel Heiberg Island
|-
| style="background:#b0e0e6;" | 
! scope="row" style="background:#b0e0e6;" | Massey Sound
| style="background:#b0e0e6;" |
|-
| 
! scope="row" | 
| Nunavut — Bjarnason Island and Amund Ringnes Island
|-
| style="background:#b0e0e6;" | 
! scope="row" style="background:#b0e0e6;" | Hendriksen Strait
| style="background:#b0e0e6;" |
|-
| 
! scope="row" | 
| Nunavut — Cornwall Island
|-
| style="background:#b0e0e6;" | 
! scope="row" style="background:#b0e0e6;" | Belcher Channel
| style="background:#b0e0e6;" |
|-
| 
! scope="row" | 
| Nunavut — Devon Island
|-
| style="background:#b0e0e6;" | 
! scope="row" style="background:#b0e0e6;" | Queens Channel
| style="background:#b0e0e6;" |
|-
| 
! scope="row" | 
| Nunavut — Little Cornwallis Island and Cornwallis Island
|-
| style="background:#b0e0e6;" | 
! scope="row" style="background:#b0e0e6;" | Parry Channel
| style="background:#b0e0e6;" |
|-valign="top"
| style="background:#b0e0e6;" | 
! scope="row" style="background:#b0e0e6;" | Peel Sound
| style="background:#b0e0e6;" | Passing just west of Somerset Island, Nunavut,  (at ) Passing just east of Prince of Wales Island, Nunavut,  (at )
|-
| 
! scope="row" | 
| Nunavut — Boothia Peninsula (mainland)
|-
| style="background:#b0e0e6;" | 
! scope="row" style="background:#b0e0e6;" | James Ross Strait
| style="background:#b0e0e6;" |
|-valign="top"
| style="background:#b0e0e6;" | 
! scope="row" style="background:#b0e0e6;" | Wellington Strait
| style="background:#b0e0e6;" | Passing just west of Matty Island, Nunavut,  (at ) Passing just east of the Tennent Islands, Nunavut,  (at )
|-
| style="background:#b0e0e6;" | 
! scope="row" style="background:#b0e0e6;" | Rae Strait
| style="background:#b0e0e6;" |
|-
| 
! scope="row" | 
| Nunavut — King William Island
|-
| style="background:#b0e0e6;" | 
! scope="row" style="background:#b0e0e6;" | Simpson Strait
| style="background:#b0e0e6;" |
|-
| 
! scope="row" | 
| Nunavut — McCrary Isthmus (mainland)
|-
| style="background:#b0e0e6;" | 
! scope="row" style="background:#b0e0e6;" | Chantrey Inlet
| style="background:#b0e0e6;" |
|-
| 
! scope="row" | 
| Nunavut — Montreal Island
|-
| style="background:#b0e0e6;" | 
! scope="row" style="background:#b0e0e6;" | Chantrey Inlet
| style="background:#b0e0e6;" |
|-valign="top"
| 
! scope="row" | 
| Nunavut — mainland Manitoba — from 
|-valign="top"
| 
! scope="row" | 
|-
| style="background:#b0e0e6;" | 
! scope="row" style="background:#b0e0e6;" | Gulf of Mexico
| style="background:#b0e0e6;" |
|-valign="top"
| 
! scope="row" | 
| Veracruz — from  Oaxaca — from 
|-
| style="background:#b0e0e6;" | 
! scope="row" style="background:#b0e0e6;" | Pacific Ocean
| style="background:#b0e0e6;" |
|-
| style="background:#b0e0e6;" | 
! scope="row" style="background:#b0e0e6;" | Southern Ocean
| style="background:#b0e0e6;" |
|-
| 
! scope="row" | Antarctica
| Unclaimed territory
|-
|}

See also
95th meridian west
97th meridian west

w096 meridian west